Mach 8 or variation, may refer to:

 Mach number for eight times the speed of sound
 Hypersonic speed of 8 times the speed of sound
 ATI Mach8, a 2D graphics chip for computer displays from ATI Technologies

See also

Mach (disambiguation)